Valeriy Grigoryevich Makrushin (14 January 1940  2003) was a cosmonaut for the Soviet Union.

Soviet space program 
Makrushin joined the Chelomey Design Bureau after graduating from the Leningrad Institute of Aviation Instrumentation in 1963. He was recruited to a cosmonaut team on March 22, 1972 and was one of the first cosmonauts selected from this design bureau.  He became the head of the Chelomey OKB-52 Mashinostroyeniya cosmonaut team until it was disbanded on April 8, 1987.  Makrushin then worked on the Almaz military program with the design bureau until his retirement.

References

1940 births
Soviet cosmonauts
2003 deaths